Events from the year 1775 in Russia

Incumbents
 Monarch – Catherine II

Events

 
 
  
  
 
 
 
 - The end of the Pugachev's Rebellion

Births

Deaths

 January 21 - Yemelyan Pugachev (born 1742)

References

1775 in Russia
Years of the 18th century in the Russian Empire